Christian René Martínez Arevalos (born May 16, 1978) is a Paraguayan footballer that currently plays for Amity FC in the Alliance League. He previously played for Persib Bandung at the Indonesia Super League.

References

External links

1977 births
Association football defenders
Paraguayan expatriate footballers
Paraguayan expatriate sportspeople in Indonesia
Paraguayan footballers
Expatriate footballers in Indonesia
Living people
Club Atlético 3 de Febrero players
Sportivo Luqueño players
Paraguayan Primera División players
Deltras F.C. players
Persib Bandung players
Liga 1 (Indonesia) players
PSIR Rembang players
PPSM Magelang players
Indonesian Premier Division players
Sportspeople from Ciudad del Este